Estuardo Masías (born 19 July 1940) is a Peruvian rower. He competed in the men's coxless pair event at the 1960 Summer Olympics.

References

1940 births
Living people
Peruvian male rowers
Olympic rowers of Peru
Rowers at the 1960 Summer Olympics
People from Cusco
20th-century Peruvian people